Hurrylall Goburdhun, (1919 - 15 September 2019), also known as "Harry Goburdhun" was a lawyer and Judge of the Supreme Court of Mauritius. He was also a Director of the transportation firm Rose Hill Transport. 

Following the on crash of the South African Airways Flight 295 on 27 November 1987 Judge Goburdhun formed part of the commission of enquiry which was presided by South African Judge Cecil Margo. The board of enquiry of the Margo Commission also included Tompkins (USA), Wilkinson (UK), Funatso (Japan), Lung (Taiwan), Gilliland and Germishuys (South Africa).

References 

1919 births
2019 deaths
20th-century Mauritian judges
Mauritian Hindus
Mauritian people of Indian descent
Mauritian businesspeople